Synothele is a genus of Australian brushed trapdoor spiders first described by Eugène Simon in 1908. The number of species in the genera was greatly expanded by Robert Raven in 1994.

Species
 it contains twenty-four species:
Synothele arrakis Raven, 1994 – Australia (Western Australia)
Synothele boongaree Raven, 1994 – Australia (Western Australia)
Synothele butleri Raven, 1994 – Australia (Western Australia)
Synothele durokoppin Raven, 1994 – Australia (Western Australia)
Synothele goongarrie Raven, 1994 – Australia (Western Australia)
Synothele harveyi Churchill & Raven, 1994 – Australia (Western Australia)
Synothele houstoni Raven, 1994 – Australia (Western Australia)
Synothele howi Raven, 1994 – Australia (Western Australia)
Synothele karara Raven, 1994 – Australia (Western Australia)
Synothele koonalda Raven, 1994 – Australia (South Australia)
Synothele longbottomi Raven, 1994 – Australia (Western Australia)
Synothele lowei Raven, 1994 – Australia (Western Australia)
Synothele meadhunteri Raven, 1994 – Australia (Western Australia, South Australia)
Synothele michaelseni Simon, 1908 (type) – Australia (Western Australia)
Synothele moonabie Raven, 1994 – Australia (South Australia)
Synothele mullaloo Raven, 1994 – Australia (Western Australia)
Synothele ooldea Raven, 1994 – Australia (South Australia)
Synothele parifusca (Main, 1954) – Australia (Western Australia)
Synothele pectinata Raven, 1994 – Australia (Western Australia)
Synothele rastelloides Raven, 1994 – Australia (Western Australia)
Synothele rubripes Raven, 1994 – Australia (Western Australia)
Synothele subquadrata Raven, 1994 – Australia (Western Australia)
Synothele taurus Raven, 1994 – Australia (Western Australia)
Synothele yundamindra Raven, 1994 – Australia (Western Australia)

References

External links

Spiders of Australia
Taxa named by Eugène Simon
Barychelidae
Mygalomorphae genera